The 1992–93 Sri Lankan cricket season featured three Test series with Sri Lanka playing against New Zealand, England and South Africa.

Honours
 P Saravanamuttu Trophy – Sinhalese Sports Club
 Hatna Trophy – no competition
 Most runs – PA de Silva 591 @ 53.72 (HS 143)
 Most wickets – CM Hathurusingha 35 @ 16.65 (BB 8-40)

Test series
Sri Lanka won the Test series against New Zealand 1–0 with 1 match drawn:
 1st Test @ Tyronne Fernando Stadium, Moratuwa – match drawn
 2nd Test @ Sinhalese Sports Club Ground, Colombo – Sri Lanka won by 9 wickets

Sri Lanka won the only Test played against England:
 1st Test @ Sinhalese Sports Club Ground, Colombo – Sri Lanka won by 5 wickets

With South Africa now re-established in international sport, its national team made an inaugural tour of Sri Lanka in 1993 and played 3 Tests.  South Africa won the series 1–0 with 2 matches drawn:
 1st Test @ Tyronne Fernando Stadium, Moratuwa – match drawn
 2nd Test @ Sinhalese Sports Club Ground, Colombo – South Africa won by innings and 208 runs
 3rd Test @ Paikiasothy Saravanamuttu Stadium, Colombo – match drawn

External sources
  CricInfo – brief history of Sri Lankan cricket
 CricketArchive – Tournaments in Sri Lanka

Further reading
 Wisden Cricketers' Almanack 1994

Sri Lankan cricket seasons from 1972–73 to 1999–2000